Deerfield Township may refer to the following places in the U.S. state of Michigan:

 Deerfield Township, Isabella County, Michigan
 Deerfield Township, Lapeer County, Michigan
 Deerfield Township, Lenawee County, Michigan
 Deerfield Township, Livingston County, Michigan
 Deerfield Township, Mecosta County, Michigan

See also
 Deerfield, Michigan, a village in Lenawee County
 Deerfield Township (disambiguation)

Michigan township disambiguation pages